The eighth and final season of Psych, containing 10 episodes, premiered on the USA Network in the United States on January 8, 2014. James Roday, Dulé Hill, Timothy Omundson, Maggie Lawson, Corbin Bernsen and Kirsten Nelson all reprise their roles as the main characters in the series.

USA Network confirmed on February 5, 2014 that the eighth season of Psych would be its last.

Production
Steve Franks continued as showrunner of the series.  The song "I Know, You Know", performed by The Friendly Indians, continues to be used as the theme song for the show.

On December 19, 2012, it was announced that Psych had been renewed for an eighth season consisting of eight episodes. On April 22, 2013, USA Network ordered five additional scripts for potential episodes. On June 25, 2013, USA Network greenlit two additional episodes of those five scripts, one to be chosen by online poll. During the 2013 Comic-Con in San Diego, it was revealed that "Dream Therapy", now known as "A Nightmare on State Street", won with more than 50% of the votes. Season 8 premiered on January 8, 2014.

Cast

James Roday continues to portray the fake psychic detective Shawn Spencer.  Dulé Hill appears as Burton "Gus" Guster.  Timothy Omundson and Maggie Lawson portray detectives Carlton "Lassie" Lassiter and Juliet "Jules" O'Hara, respectively.  Corbin Bernsen continues as Henry Spencer, and Kirsten Nelson returns as SBPD Chief Karen Vick.

Cary Elwes returned to portray the character of Pierre Despereaux for the fourth time in the series' run. He appeared alongside Vinnie Jones in the first episode of the season. Anthony Michael Hall reprises his role as Interim Chief Harris Trout, while Kristy Swanson, Kurt Fuller and Sage Brocklebank return as Marlowe Lassiter, Woody the Coroner and Buzz McNab, respectively. John Kapelos also returns as Tom Swaggerty, the Mayor of Santa Barbara, for the sixth episode of the season, called "1967: A Psych Odyssey", that marks the directorial debut of Kirsten Nelson. Phylicia Rashad returned as Gus' mother. Curt Smith returns as himself. Mira Sorvino appears as Head Detective Betsy Brannigan

Dana Ashbrook, Katharine Isabelle, Carlos Jacott, Ed Lover, Ralph Macchio, Lindsay Sloane, Janet Varney, Alan Ruck, and Ray Wise guest star in the third episode of the season, a special all-star remake of the season one episode "Cloudy... With a Chance of Murder", with Michael Weston reprising his role as Adam Hornstock from the original episode.

Tom Arnold,  The Bella Twins, Corbin Bleu, Yvette Nicole Brown, Dean Cameron, Bruce Campbell, Olivia d'Abo, Loretta Devine, Sutton Foster, Vincent Gale, Kali Hawk, Vinnie Jones, Val Kilmer, Floriana Lima, Peggy Lipton, Deon Richmond, Peter Stormare, Vincent Ventresca, Vincent M. Ward, Celia Weston, William Zabka and Billy Zane also guest star in different episodes of the season.

Episodes

DVD release
Psych: The Complete Eighth Season, consisting of ten episodes, was released on April 1, 2014. The three-disc set includes deleted scenes, episode podcasts, montages, featurettes and a gag reel. The seventh season television special "Psych: The Musical" is also included.

References

Psych
2014 American television seasons